Pseudochazara mamurra, the buff Asian grayling, is a species of butterfly in the family Nymphalidae. It is confined to Albania, Greece, and Turkey. The habitat consists of slopes in steep river valleys.

It is a very variable species.

Flight period 
The species is univoltine and is on wing from June to August.

Food plants
Larvae feed on grasses.

Subspecies
Pseudochazara mamurra mamurra (Turkey)
Pseudochazara mamurra amymone Brown, 1976 - Brown's grayling (Greece and Albania)
Pseudochazara mamurra birgit Gross, 1978 (Turkey)

Pseudochazara mamurra amymone is alternatively treated as a full species.

Gallery

References

 Satyrinae of the Western Palearctic - Pseudochazara mamurra

Pseudochazara
Butterflies described in 1852